The flag of Liguria is one of the official symbols of the region of Liguria, Italy. The current flag was adopted on 7 July 1997.

Symbolism
Each color has the following meaning:

 The green represents the Ligurian Alps and the Ligurian Apennines;
 The red represents the blood shed for Italian unification;
 The blue represents the Ligurian Sea.

At the center of the flag is the coat of arms of Liguria: a stylized caravel, symbolizing the maritime traditions of the region and its great navigators, positioned below the historical flag of the Republic of Genoa (the current flag of the modern-day city of Genoa). The four six-pointed stars imposed on the Genovese flag represent the four provinces of Liguria: the Province of Genoa, the Province of Imperia, the Province of La Spezia, and the Province of Savona.

Adoption

(L.R. 7 luglio 1997 Art.1)

"The flag of the Liguria Region is formed by a cloth of rectangular shape with the coat of arms of the Liguria Region, as identified by Regional Law No. 3 of 15 January 1985 (the adoption of the emblem and the banner of the Region, in accordance with Article 1 of the Statute), placed on the bottom of colored vertical stripes of equal width, from left to right, green, red and sea-blue sea; the emblem has dimensions equal to three-fifths of the height of the same flag."
(Regional Law of 7 July 1997, Article 1 )

Gallery

References

Flags of regions of Italy
Liguria
Flags introduced in 1997